Nic Henning (born 26 April 1969) is a South African professional golfer.

Professional career 
Henning states he had "no choice" but to become a professional golfer as he was born into a big golfing family; his father, Graham Henning, and three of his uncles were professional golfers.

He qualified for the Sunshine Tour before the 1992–93 season. His best performance during his early years was a runner-up performance at the Zimbabwe Open at the beginning of the 1993–94 season.

Henning qualified for the European Tour before the 1994 season. He did not play well, recording only one top-10 and did not come close to keeping his card.

He returned to South Africa where he played for the remainder of the 1990s and recorded a number of top-10s before finally winning the 1999 Vodacom Players Championship. He defeated Northern Ireland's Darren Clarke, then one of the top players in the world, in a playoff. He still regards it as his top achievement as a professional. He would finish in second place on the South African Tour's Order of Merit for the 1999–2000 season.

The following year, Henning qualified for his only major championship, the 2000 Open Championship, and his only World Golf Championship event, the WGC-American Express Championship. He missed the cut at the Open but finished T-17 at the WGC event held at Valderrama Golf Club, even placing in the top-10 after the first round.

In 2001 Henning qualified for the European Tour for the second time. At two early events in South America, he recorded consecutive top-10s but his play quickly regressed after that. He would finish #145 on the Order of Merit and did not keep his card.

Henning returned to South Africa during the early 2000s and would have much success. He won the 2003 Royal Swazi Sun Classic and the 2004 Capital Alliance Royal Swazi Sun Open. He recorded his fourth and final win at the 2005 Vodacom Origins of Golf Tour defeating Doug McGuigan by a shot. Later in the year, in October, he tied Anton Haig after four rounds at the Seekers Travel Pro-Am but lost to him in a playoff. In 2008, he also finished the Nashua Golf Challenge and MTC Namibia PGA Championship tied in regulation but lost both in playoffs.

Professional wins (4)

Sunshine Tour wins (4)

Sunshine Tour playoff record (1–3)

Results in major championships

CUT = missed the half-way cut
Note: Henning only played in The Open Championship.

Results in World Golf Championships

"T" = Tied

Team appearances
World Cup (representing South Africa): 1998

References

External links

South African male golfers
Sunshine Tour golfers
Sportspeople from Pretoria
White South African people
1969 births
Living people